Gutian or variation, may refer to:

China
 Gutian County (古田县), Fujian
 Gutian railway station
 Gutian dialect, a dialect of Chinese spoken in Gutian
 Gutian Massacre (1895), massacre of Christians in Gutian County
 Gutian, Liancheng County (姑田镇), town in Liancheng County, Fujian
 Gutian, Shanghang County (古田镇), town in Shanghang County, Fujian
 Gutian Congress, meeting of the Chinese Communist Party in 1929
 Gu Tian (古田), a cargo ship, the largest concrete ship built in China

Near East
 Gutian people, a Bronze Age people of West Asia
 Gutian language, language of Gutian people
 Gutian dynasty of Sumer (𒄖𒋾𒌝𒆠), dynasty in Mesopotamia

See also

 
 
 Gu (disambiguation)
 Tian (disambiguation)

Language and nationality disambiguation pages